Kleinkarlbach is an Ortsgemeinde – a municipality belonging to a Verbandsgemeinde, a kind of collective municipality – in the Bad Dürkheim district in Rhineland-Palatinate, Germany.

Geography

Location 
The municipality is a winegrowing centre and lies in the Palatinate in the northwest of the Rhine-Neckar urban agglomeration. Kleinkarlbach belongs to the Verbandsgemeinde of Leiningerland, formed in 2018, whose seat is in Grünstadt, although that town is itself not in the Verbandsgemeinde. Until 1969, the municipality belonged to the now abolished district of Frankenthal. Kleinkarlbach lies at the entrance to the Leiningen Valley (Leininger Tal) on the river Eckbach, which is part of the Rhine’s catchment area.

History 
In 770, Kleinkarlbach had its first documentary mention in the Lorsch codex. In 873 it belonged to the Murbach Monastery. In 1309 it was granted as a fief to the House of Leiningen. After the French Revolution it belonged to the Department of Mont-Tonnerre (or Donnersberg in German) and from 1813 to 1816 lay Kleinkarlbach under Austrian administration, before it was annexed to the Kingdom of Bavaria as part of the Rheinkreis.

Religion 
In 1555, the Reformation was introduced into the Leiningerland (lands held by the Counts of Leiningen) and Kleinkarlbach thereby became Lutheran.

In 2007, 52.9% of the inhabitants were Evangelical and 23.8% Catholic. The rest belonged to other faiths or adhered to none.

Politics

Municipal council 
The council is made up of 12 council members, who were elected at the municipal election held on 7 June 2009, and the honorary mayor as chairman.

The municipal election held on 7 June 2009 yielded the following results:

Coat of arms 
The German blazon reads: In Gold ein grüner Wellenbalken.

The municipality's arms might in English heraldic language be described thus: Or a fess wavy vert.

The arms were approved in 1982 by the Regierungsbezirk government in Neustadt and date from a 1452 court seal in which the wavy stripe were slanted rather than fess (horizontal).

Famous people

Honorary citizens 
 1973: Irmgard Spiess
 2004: Honorary Consul Dr. Dieter Spiess

References

External links 
 Municipality’s official webpage 
 Kleinkarlbach in the collective municipality’s Web pages 

Bad Dürkheim (district)